YL may refer to:

 YL (rapper), Hispanic American rapper from Chicago
 YL (rapper), French rapper of Algerian origin
 YL Male Voice Choir, a Finnish choir, formerly Helsinki University Chorus
 Yamal Airlines, a Russian airline
 Year of Love (Y.L.), an alternative to Anno Domini (A.D.) developed by Ezra Heywood
 Yellow Line (Washington Metro)
 Yorba Linda, California, a suburb of Los Angeles, United States
 YL, Morse Code for Young lady
 Young Life, a non-denominational Christian ministry in the United States
 YL, a country prefix for aircraft registered in [Latvia]

See also
 The suffix -yl, used in organic chemistry to form names of radicals, either separate species (called free radicals) or chemically bonded parts of molecules (called moieties). 
 YL v Birmingham CC, a 2007 UK constitutional law case, concerning judicial review.
 Young Ladies Radio League, referring in telegraphy and amateur radio to a female operator of any age